Shuko Aoyama and Makoto Ninomiya were the defending champions, but lost in the first round.

Rika Fujiwara and Yuki Naito won the title, defeating Jamie Loeb and An-Sophie Mestach in the final, 6–4, 6–7(12–14), [10–8].

Seeds

Draw

References 
 Draw

Ando Securities Open - Doubles